Ultrakill (stylized in all caps as ULTRAKILL) is a first-person shooter platformer video game developed by Arsi "Hakita" Patala and published by New Blood Interactive. It was released through Early Access on Steam for Microsoft Windows on September 3, 2020. The game uses retro-style graphics and movement capabilities similar to those of 1990s first-person shooters such as Quake and Doom.

Plot 
In Ultrakill, the player controls V1, a machine that uses blood as a fuel source. Humanity fought a major war, and V1 was built for the purpose of fighting in this war. However, the war ended before V1 could enter mass production, meaning only one model of it remained in existence. But V1's thirst for blood led it, along with other similar robots, to turn on the humans, eventually driving them to extinction. Some time after, as blood supplies above ground dwindle, the machines begin mounting expeditions into Hell to extract some from the demons and lost souls within. The game’s introduction, the Prelude, follows V1 as it battles into the mouth of Hell, breaking through its guardians to get into Hell proper.

Act 1, Infinite Hyperdeath, consists of the first three layers of Hell: Limbo, Lust, and Gluttony. At the bottom of Limbo, after encounters with hostile machines trapped inside Hell, V1 encounters V2; an updated prototype model designed for peacetime instead of war. The two engage in a duel, culminating in V2 losing its arm and V1 claiming it as a trophy. In Lust, V1’s descent is barred by a parasite controlling the corpse of King Minos, the layer’s former ruler who was murdered by the archangel Gabriel for refusing to punish his subjects. V1 travels through the body’s innards into Gluttony.

While in Gluttony, if the player has earned a perfect ranking in every level of the act, V1 has the chance to encounter a being known as the Flesh Prison that houses the soul of King Minos. Upon defeating the Flesh Prison, King Minos' soul is freed and forms into Minos Prime, who declares revenge against Heaven for their treatment of the Lust layer's civilians, and against V1 for the machines’ annihilation of humanity. Nonetheless, Minos is eventually defeated by V1, who then expresses his sadness in not rescuing humanity from everything attempting to harm it before he dissipates. Traveling further into Gluttony, V1 encounters Gabriel, who intervenes directly to try and stop them from getting any further into Hell. He loses the ensuing fight, swearing vengeance as he retreats to report to the Heavenly Council. As punishment for his failure, the Council extract God's light from his body, leaving him with only 24 hours to destroy V1 before he dies.

In Act 2, Imperfect Hatred, V1 continues onward through Hell’s middle layers: Greed, Wrath, and Heresy. The sand-swept Greed layer sees V1 contending with the remnants of a failed insurrection against Heaven by King Sisyphus, which ended after he was personally beheaded by Gabriel. At the bottom of the layer, V2 reappears with a replacement arm torn from another machine and challenges V1 to a rematch; this time, V1 apparently destroys it before it can escape and takes the new arm for its own again. Descending into Wrath, V1 passes through the flooded Styx, killing a biblical Leviathan formed out of resigned souls after it capsizes the ferry to the layer below.

Upon finally reaching the Heresy layer, V1 faces stiff demonic resistance as Gabriel urges them from afar to travel further down. If the player has once again perfected every level in Act 2 and has faced Minos Prime, V1 can take a detour and encounters King Sisyphus's Prime Soul, Sisyphus Prime, who escapes from his own prison. Sensing V1 is responsible for Minos’s final death, Sisyphus challenges the machine to single combat as “an appetizer” before he plans to resume his rebellion. As he dies, he accepts the futility of his struggle but shows no remorse for his actions. V1 finally reaches Gabriel, who seethes with unconstrained rage at them for humiliating him before immediately pressing the attack. As the fight goes on, his rage turns into exhilaration, and upon his defeat he finds himself coming to respect V1, retreating to process the relief he feels in his own failure. His worldview now challenged, Gabriel comes to realize that he cannot overcome the machines because the power of the Angels has waned due to the disappearance of God. Recognizing that the Council has been hiding God's disappearance yet is still content to rule Heaven and Hell in His name, Gabriel returns to Heaven and massacres them to end their corrupt regime.

Gameplay 
Ultrakill is a first-person shooter which takes place in a series of levels based on Dante's layers of Hell. The game is divided into a prelude and three acts, with the prelude containing one area (called a layer) with four levels and a major boss level, each proceeding act containing three layers with the first two having three levels and one major boss level, and the third having only one level and a major boss level.

The player has access to 6 classes of weapons: the revolver, the shotgun, the nailgun, the railcannon, the rocket launcher and the arm, with each weapon receiving multiple variants, and some receiving alternates, such as the sawlauncher for the nailgun. The player can perform combos or do other stylish actions in order to build a style meter through eight ranks from Destructive to ULTRAKILL and earn style points, similar to games such as Devil May Cry.

A key game mechanic in Ultrakill is the ability for the player to gain health by absorbing the fresh blood of damaged enemies, done by damaging or killing enemies while near them or performing a parry on certain enemy attacks. However, certain other mechanics can prevent or disrupt this, such as enemies covered in sand not dropping blood for the player to absorb, or water diluting blood when an enemy is killed underwater, making said blood easier to pick up, but reduces the amount healed. The recovery of health can also be diminished by taking too much of what is known was "hard damage", temporarily reducing the maximum amount of health the player can recover.

At the end of each level the player will earn a letter grade rank from D to S in time, enemies killed, and total style points, which are then averaged to give an overall level rank. Completing a level without dying or reloading to a checkpoint, and with an S rank in all 3 categories, will award the player with a P (for perfect) rank. This is the highest possible rank that can be achieved.

Each level of Ultrakill contains hidden collectibles in the form of soul orbs and includes a challenge. Completing the challenge, finding all soul orbs, and getting the highest rank (P), will reward the player by making the level appear gold in the level select menu. Upon completing an entire Act to 100%, the Act screen and icon will all become gold as well.

Ultrakill also has what are known as Secret Levels. These levels can be found on certain layers through secret doors. These levels deviate from the traditional Ultrakill gameplay and opt for a spin or rift on other video games and video game genres.

Getting a P rank on every level within an act and locating a secret entrance will allow the player to enter the act's Prime Sanctum, with the next sequential Prime Sanctum needing the pervious one to be cleared beforehand. You do not have to get a P rank on the Prime Sanctums to progress to the next. Prime Sanctums contain one or more bosses that are a drastic step up in difficulty compared to the other levels within the act.

Ultrakill also features an endless mode called "The Cyber Grind", where the player fights random waves of enemies over a floating arena which transforms after each wave. This mode awards the player with points upon completion, which can be used to purchase weapon mods at yellow terminals. The Cyber Grind can be visually altered by the player to display different textures inside the Cyber Grind arena. After clearing a set amount of waves, you can set the Cyber Grind to begin at a designated wave instead of starting over from the beginning (Ex. Clearing wave 20 allows the player to start at wave 10).

Reception 
, Ultrakill had received over 35,000 Steam reviews, with a score of 98%, making it the 11th highest-rated game on Steam. The game was praised for its movement mechanics and authenticity towards earlier arena shooters and first-person shooters.
(On January 12, 2023, the position of it was moved from the 11th highest-rated on Steam to the 10th highest-rated, though on the 13th of January it moved back to its original place; this also meant that Ultrakill was placed above Left 4 Dead 2.)
Christopher Livingston of PC Gamer described Ultrakill as faster and "even more metal than Doom Eternal" and commended the game for its verticality.

References 

Angels in popular culture
Early access video games
First-person shooters
Hell in popular culture
Linux games
New Blood Interactive games
Platform games
Indie video games
Retro-style video games
Single-player video games
Upcoming video games
Video games about demons
Video games about robots
Video games developed in Finland
Video games set in hell
Windows games